Byron J. Strough House is a historic home located at Orleans in Jefferson County, New York. It is a -story, seven-by-five-bay structure built in 1911 with eclectic Classical Revival design features.  It features a hipped roof with low, horizontal massing and a prominent full-width front porch. Also on the property are a one car garage and small ice house.

It was listed on the National Register of Historic Places in 1997.

References

Houses on the National Register of Historic Places in New York (state)
Neoclassical architecture in New York (state)
Houses completed in 1911
Houses in Jefferson County, New York
National Register of Historic Places in Jefferson County, New York